The Love Toy is a lost 1926 American silent comedy film directed by Erle C. Kenton and starring Lowell Sherman, Jane Winton, and Willard Louis. The film was produced and distributed by Warner Brothers.

Lowell Sherman and Helene Costello were later married.

Cast
Lowell Sherman as Peter Remsen
Jane Winton as The Bride
Willard Louis as King Lavoris
Gayne Whitman as Prime Minister
Ethel Grey Terry as Queen Zita
Helene Costello as Princess Patricia
Maude George as Lady in Waiting
Myrna Loy as Bit role (uncredited)

References

External links

Lobby cards (archived)
Lobby card

1926 films
American silent feature films
Lost American films
Warner Bros. films
Films directed by Erle C. Kenton
American black-and-white films
Silent American comedy films
1926 comedy films
1926 lost films
Lost comedy films
1920s American films